The Pearl Kiosk was a mansion directly located at the banks of the Bosphorus and served as a pleasure building for the Ottoman sultan. It was built in 1590 by the grand vizier Koca Sinan Pasha.

Literature 
 Fanny Davis. Palace of Topkapi in Istanbul. 1970. ASIN B000NP64Z2

Buildings and structures completed in 1590
Houses completed in the 16th century
16th-century churches
Topkapı Palace
Bosphorus